Kasper Ipsen (born 7 July 1984) is a Danish badminton player from the Holte badmintonklub. In 2005, he received a badminton awards from Poul-Erik Høyer Larsen, a former president of the Badminton World Federation and Danish Olympic gold medallist. In 2008, he won the men's singles title at the Cyprus International tournament.

Achievements

BWF International Challenge/Series
Men's singles

 BWF International Challenge tournament
 BWF International Series tournament

References

External links 
 

Living people
1984 births
Danish male badminton players